Vancleave is an unincorporated community and census-designated place (CDP) in Jackson County, Mississippi, United States. It is part of the Pascagoula Metropolitan Statistical Area. The population was 5,886 at the 2010 census, up from 4,910 at the 2000 census.

Geography
The original hamlet of Vancleave is along Mississippi Highway 57 on high ground north of the valley of Bluff Creek. The CDP limits extend north as far as Mississippi Highway 614 (Wade–Vancleave Road), east to the Pascagoula River and Ward Bayou, and south to the Gautier city line at the mouth of Bluff Creek. The western boundary is formed mainly by Bluff Creek and Highway 57.

Demographics

2020 census

As of the 2020 United States census, there were 5,592 people, 1,785 households, and 1,224 families residing in the CDP.

2000 census
As of the census of 2000, there were 4,910 people, 1,624 households, and 1,354 families residing in the CDP. The population density was 113.1 people per square mile (43.7/km). There were 1,764 housing units at an average density of 40.6/sq mi (15.7/km). The racial makeup of the CDP was 91.20% White, 6.74% African American, 0.57% Native American, 0.26% Asian, 0.24% from other races, and 0.98% from two or more races. Hispanic or Latino of any race were 0.96% of the population.

There were 1,624 households, out of which 41.8% had children under the age of 18 living with them, 68.8% were married couples living together, 10.1% had a female householder with no husband present, and 16.6% were non-families. 13.6% of all households were made up of individuals, and 5.5% had someone living alone who was 65 years of age or older. The average household size was 3.00 and the average family size was 3.30.

In the CDP, the population was spread out, with 29.6% under the age of 18, 8.2% from 18 to 24, 29.9% from 25 to 44, 23.0% from 45 to 64, and 9.3% who were 65 years of age or older. The median age was 34 years. For every 100 females, there were 104.9 males. For every 100 females age 18 and over, there were 102.3 males.

The median income for a household in the CDP was $39,034, and the median income for a family was $41,426. Males had a median income of $36,135 versus $21,078 for females. The per capita income for the CDP was $14,349. About 9.6% of families and 13.9% of the population were below the poverty line, including 19.8% of those under age 18 and 12.2% of those age 65 or over.

Public safety

Fire department
The Central Jackson County Fire Department provides fire protection for the community.

Law enforcement
The Jackson County Sheriff's Office provides law enforcement services for the community.

Education
Vancleave is served by the Jackson County School District. It includes two elementary schools, one middle school, and one high school. Vancleave is also home to a branch of the Jackson-George Regional Library, located at 12604 Highway 57.

Elementary schools
 Vancleave Lower Elementary School
 Vancleave Upper Elementary School

Middle school
 Vancleave Middle School

High school
 Vancleave High School

Notable people
 Elley Duhé, pop music singer-songwriter.
 Paul Overstreet, Nashville singer-songwriter (of such songs as "Diggin' Up Bones")
 Mike Seymour, member of the Mississippi State Senate
 Chris White, football linebacker with the New England Patriots.

References

Census-designated places in Jackson County, Mississippi
Census-designated places in Mississippi
Pascagoula metropolitan area